Elizabeth Thomson (born 17 October 1955) is a New Zealand artist.

Background 

Thomson was born 1955 in Titirangi, Auckland. She graduated from the Elam School of Fine Arts in 1988 with a Master of Fine Arts. Thomson is based in Wellington.

Career 

Thomson is a painter, utilising botanical, entomological or molecular forms and incorporating them into abstract geometric compositions. She uses various tools and techniques to create her works, including sculpture and miniatures.

In 1998, Thomson won the Paramount Award in the Wallace Arts Awards with her piece 'Southern Cross Paterre'. In 1987 and 1989 she received grants from the Arts Council of New Zealand.

Thomson is represented by Page Blackie Gallery.

Works by Thomson are held in the public collections of the Museum of New Zealand Te Papa Tongarewa and Auckland Art Gallery Toi o Tāmaki.

Exhibitions 

 2017, The Black-and-whites, Page Blackie Gallery, Wellington
 2017, Invitation to Openness, Two Rooms, Auckland
 2017, Landscape 2017, Page Blackie Gallery, Wellington (group show)
 2016, Freedom and Structure | Navigating the Zone, Page Blackie Gallery, Wellington
 2016, Subliminal, Two Rooms, Auckland
 2015, Botanical Studies, Page Blackie Gallery, Wellington
 2015, Body of the Sentient, Two Rooms, Auckland
 2015, Between Memory and Oblivion, Page Blackie Gallery, Wellington
 2014, Transitive States, Two Rooms, Auckland
 2014, Hanene - Breathing Gently, Page Blackie Gallery, Wellington
 2014, Voyage Sauvage, Dominik Mersch Gallery, Sydney
 2014, Elysian Fields, Pataka Art + Museum, Porirua
 2013, Landscape, Page Blackie Gallery, Wellington
 2013, Auckland Art Fair
 2013, Line/Form/Colour/Intention - An Exhibition Exploring Abstraction, Blackie Gallery, Wellington
 2012, The Ocean of Eden, Two Rooms, Auckland
 2012, Islands of Dodonaea, RH Gallery, Upper Moutere, Nelson
 2011, Colour/Field, City Gallery Wellington, Wellington
 2010, Another Green World, Tauranga Art Gallery, Tauranga
 2009, Le Planete Sauvage, Two Rooms, Auckland
 2009, Tonight in the Mystic Garden, Black Barn Gallery, Havelock North
 2008, Astrophysics and the Thomson Effect, Mark Hutchins Gallery, Wellington 
 2008, Supposition, Two Rooms, Auckland
 2008, Horoeka, RH Gallery, Upper Moutere, Nelson
 2007, Relativity and the Fourth Dimension, Mark Hutchins, Wellington
 2007, Studies for the Bigger Picture, Anna Bibby Gallery, Auckland
 2006, Elizabeth Thomson: My Hi-Fi, My Sci- Fi, touring show, curated by Gregory O’Brien for City Art Gallery, Wellington

References

Further reading 
Artist files for Elizabeth Thomson are held at:
 Angela Morton Collection, Takapuna Library
 E. H. McCormick Research Library, Auckland Art Gallery Toi o Tāmaki
 Robert and Barbara Stewart Library and Archives, Christchurch Art Gallery Te Puna o Waiwhetu
 Fine Arts Library, University of Auckland
 Hocken Collections Uare Taoka o Hākena
 Te Aka Matua Research Library, Museum of New Zealand Te Papa Tongarewa
 Macmillan Brown Library, University of Canterbury
Also see:
 Concise Dictionary of New Zealand Artists McGahey, Kate (2000) Gilt Edge

Living people
1955 births
People from Auckland
Elam Art School alumni
New Zealand painters
New Zealand women painters
People associated with the Museum of New Zealand Te Papa Tongarewa